The Observation Tower Burgstall is a 24 metre tall observation tower on the Burgstall mountain near the village Kirchberg on the Danube River in Austria. The tower has an unusual pentangular cross section.

See also
List of towers

External links
Observation Tower Burgstall

Towers in Austria